Roy Ogden Wise (November 18, 1923 – February 25, 2008) was a professional baseball pitcher. He played in Major League Baseball for the Pittsburgh Pirates during the 1944 Pittsburgh Pirates season appearing in two games on May 12 and May 13. He died in Irvine, California on February 25, 2008.

References

External links

Major League Baseball pitchers
Pittsburgh Pirates players
Albany Senators players
Illinois Wesleyan Titans baseball players
Baseball players from Illinois
1923 births
2008 deaths
Sportspeople from Springfield, Illinois